Ardudar (also Romanized as Ardūdar, Ardūdār, and Ordūdār) is a village in Pachehlak-e Sharqi Rural District, in the Central District of Aligudarz County, Lorestan Province, Iran. At the 2006 census, its population was 212, in 53 families.

References 

Towns and villages in Aligudarz County